The Ora iQ is a battery electric compact car produced by the Chinese car manufacturer Great Wall Motors under its electric vehicle brand, Ora in 2018–2020.

History

In May 2018, Great Wall Motors announced the launch of the new Ora electric car brand. The first model was the compact iQ model combining the features of a crossover with a three-box sedan body.

The characteristic features of the exterior were narrow, longitudinal headlights with cutouts at the edges of the fenders, as well as long, one-piece rear lamps running across the entire width of the body.

Sale
The iQ was developed for the Mainland Chinese market in mind, and started on sale in August 2018. In the first full year of sales, 2019, Ora sold 10,300 units of the iQ.

Technical data
The iQ is an electric crossover with a battery capacity of 46.57 kWh. The car develops 100 km/h in 7.7 seconds, reaches a maximum of 150 km/h and develops 163 HP at 280 Nm of maximum torque.

References

External links

iQ
2020s cars
Cars introduced in 2018
Compact sport utility vehicles
Crossover sport utility vehicles
Front-wheel-drive vehicles
Production electric cars
Cars of China